Raimo Suikkanen (20 December 1942 – 22 January 2021) was a Finnish racing cyclist. He competed at the 1968 Summer Olympics and the 1972 Summer Olympics.

References

External links
 

1942 births
2021 deaths
People from Iitti
Finnish male cyclists
Olympic cyclists of Finland
Cyclists at the 1968 Summer Olympics
Cyclists at the 1972 Summer Olympics
Sportspeople from Kymenlaakso